Liberty Township is an inactive township in St. Francois County, in the U.S. state of Missouri.

Liberty Township was erected in 1821, and named for the American concept of liberty.

References

Townships in Missouri
Townships in St. Francois County, Missouri